Devils is the seventh studio album by the gothic rock band The 69 Eyes released on 22 October 2004 on Virgin / EMI. It is their first CD to be released in North America.

Track listing
 "Devils" – 3:52
 "Feel Berlin" – 4:09
 "Nothing on You" – 4:10
 "Sister of Charity" – 5:04
 "Lost Boys" – 3:23
 "Jimmy" – 3:10
 "August Moon" – 3:37
 "Beneath the Blue" (feat. Ville Valo) – 3:13
 "Christina Death" – 4:02
 "Hevioso" – 4:12
 "Only You Can Save Me" – 3:33

Bonus tracks
"From Dusk 'Til Dawn" 
"Pitchblack"

Singles
Lost Boys
"Lost Boys" – 3:25

Devils
"Devils" – 4:00
"From Dusk 'Til Dawn" – 3:22

Feel Berlin
"Feel Berlin" (Edit) – 3:58
"Pitchblack" – 4:49
"Devils" (Video)

Feel Berlin – Maxi Single
"Feel Berlin" (Radio Edit) – 3:58
"Feel Berlin" (Original Version) – 4:07
"From Dusk Till Dawn" – 3:22
"Feel Berlin"(Live) – 4:42
"Lost Boys"(Live) – 4:43

Sister of Charity
"Sister of Charity" – 5:04
"Lost Boys" (Video)

References

2004 albums
The 69 Eyes albums